Patricia Alcivar (born December 12, 1977) is a competitive road and adventure racer, model, commercial/fitness actress and former professional boxer.

Alcivar was born in Barranquilla, Colombia, but grew up in Jackson Heights, Queens, where her family moved when she was a toddler. She was raised in an abusive household and moved out on her own at the young age of 15.  She survived against all odds by working a part-time job to support herself while finishing high school with honors.

Early Martial Arts Career
Alcivar practiced and competed in the martial art of Kyokushin. She started at the age of 13 and won a world championship at age 18 at the Manhattan Center in 1995.

Amateur Boxing Career
Alcivar started her amateur Boxing career shortly after winning the world title in Kyokushin.  She enrolled in a Boxing Aerobics class where she challenged the coach of the class who was Martin Snow. Alcivar went on to have a fantastic amateur career often noted as a pioneer in women's boxing.  She had around 35 amateur fights and won two New York City Daily News Golden Gloves Championships, a national championship and won an international competition.  She was the first female boxer to be voted the athlete of the year by the United States Olympic Committee.,

Professional boxing career

Patricia started her professional Boxing Career on October 9, 2009 with a first-round knockout over Jennifer Batchelder.  This fight took place in Columbia, Tennessee.  Alcivar then faced Laura Gomez May 16, 2010 in Kissimmee, Florida and won that fight by a fourth-round TKO.  For her third fight on August 13, 2010 she won by TKO in the third round over Shari Denise Jacobs in Tampa, Florida. Alcivar then had a rematch with Laura Gomez on March 4, 2011, in Alcivars home town of Queens, New York and was taken the distance for the first time with unanimous decision with all three judges scoring all four rounds for Alcivar. Alcivar defeated Savanna "The Lioness" Hill on April 2, 2011 at Roger Dean Stadium in Jupiter, Florida.  She won by a decisive 6 round unanimous decision.  The cards read 60-54 twice and 60-53.  Hill was looking to go several times during the fight and actually appeared to be crying during the fight as she was taking a fierce beating from Alcivar. Alcivar was help guided by Johnny Faraće.

Professional boxing record

See also
 List of female boxers

References

 [VIBE Magazine, March 1999, "Mamí Said Knock You Out"]

External links
 www.patriciaalcivar.com
 Patricia Alcivar at Awakening Fighters
 Professional Boxing record at Boxrec

1977 births
People from Barranquilla
Living people
American women boxers
Boxers from New York (state)
American sportspeople of Colombian descent
Kyokushin kaikan practitioners
American female karateka
Flyweight boxers
21st-century American women